Argyroeides sanguinea is a moth of the subfamily Arctiinae. It was described by Schaus in 1896. It is found in the Brazilian states of Paraná and Rio Grande do Sul.

References

Moths described in 1896
Argyroeides
Moths of South America